Oliver Miller (April 15, 1824 – October 18, 1892) was a justice of the Maryland Court of Appeals from 1867 to 1892.

Early life, education, and career
Born in Middletown, Connecticut, to Giles and Clarissa Miller, he went to Frederick City to live with his sister, Mrs. Converse, whoso husband was principal of tha Academy in that town. He attended schools in Middletown, Frederick, Maryland, and Leesburg, Virginia, and graduated from Dartmouth College with high honors in 1848. That year he went to Annapolis and read law under Alexander Randall, gaining admission to the bar in Maryland in 1850.

Miller reported and arranged four volumes of Maryland chancery decisions by Chancellor John Johnson Jr.. From 1853 to 1862 he was reporter of the Court of Appeals, reporting the Maryland Reports from the third to the eighteenth volume inclusive.

Political and judicial service
Miller was a member of the constitutional convention of 1864, represented Anne Aruadel county as a Democrat in the Maryland House of Delegates in 1865, 1866 and 1867. In the latter session he was Speaker of the House. At the first election under the new constitution, in November 1867, he was elected chief judge of tbe fifth judicial circuit, comprising the counties of Anne Arundel, Howard and Carroll, and was re-elected in 1882.

Miller resigned from the bench due to failing health on October 1, 1892.

Personal life and death
Miller was married. His wife died four years before him. He died at his home in Ellicott City, Maryland, at the age of 68, and was interred in Baltimore's Loudon Park Cemetery.

References

1824 births
1892 deaths
People from Middletown, Connecticut
Dartmouth College alumni
U.S. state supreme court judges admitted to the practice of law by reading law
Members of the Maryland House of Delegates
Speakers of the Maryland House of Delegates
Judges of the Maryland Court of Appeals